Korelkino is a rural locality (a village) in Malyshevskoye Rural Settlement, Selivanovsky District, Vladimir Oblast, Russia. The population was 11 as of 2010.

Geography 
Korelkino is located 36 km south of Krasnaya Gorbatka (the district's administrative centre) by road. Drachyovo is the nearest rural locality.

References 

Rural localities in Selivanovsky District